This list of Ramsar wetlands of Thailand comprises Thai wetlands deemed to be of "international importance" under the Ramsar Convention. For a full list of all Ramsar sites worldwide, see the Ramsar list of wetlands of international importance.

 there are 15 Ramsar sites in Thailand, totalling 405,219 hectares.

According to WWF, wetlands are one of the most threatened of all ecosystems, because of progressive loss of vegetation, salinization, excessive inundation, water pollution, invasive species, development, and road building.

See also
List of protected areas of Thailand

References

External links
Annotated Ramsar List: Thailand
WWF - Thailand (in Thai)
WWF - Environmental conservation work in Thailand
Ramsar Information Sheet
A push for 20 new Ramsar sites in Thailand
Map of 20 nominated Ramsar sites in Thailand © WWF



Ramsar
Thailand